The Château de Gisors is a castle in the town of Gisors in the department of Eure, France. The castle was a key fortress of the Dukes of Normandy in the 11th and 12th centuries. It was intended to defend the Anglo-Norman Vexin territory from the pretensions of the King of France.

History

King William II of England ordered Robert of Bellême to build the first castle at Gisors. Henry I of England built the octagonal stone keep surmounting the motte; his work at Gisors was part of a programme of royal castle building in Normandy during his reign to secure the region against the aspirations of the French crown. It saw the construction of more than 25 castles.

In 1193, as King Richard I of England (also Duke of Normandy) was imprisoned in Germany, the castle, while under the command of Gilbert de Vascoeuil fell into the hands of King Philip II of France. After Richard's death in 1199, Philip conquered much of the rest of Normandy and Gisors thereafter lost a good part of its importance as a frontier castle. 

The castle is also known for its links with the Templars. Put into their charge by the French king between 1158 and 1160, it became the final prison of the Grand Master of the Order, Jacques de Molay, in 1314.

Although it has been estimated that the bailey could have housed 1,000 soldiers, in 1438 (during the Hundred Years' War) the English garrison numbered just 90. By 1448, this had decreased to 43.

Description

The first building work is dated to about 1095, and consisted of a motte, which was enclosed in a spacious courtyard or bailey. Henry I of England, Duke of Normandy, added an octagonal stone keep to the motte. After 1161, important reinforcement work saw this keep raised and augmented; the wooden palisade of the motte converted to stone, thus forming a chemise; and the outer wall of the bailey was completed in stone with flanking towers. The octagonal keep is considered one of the best preserved examples of a shell keep.

A second keep, cylindrical, called the Prisoner's Tower (tour du prisonnier), was added to the outer wall of the castle at the start of the 13th century, following the French conquest of Normandy. Further reinforcement was added during the Hundred Years' War. In the 16th century, earthen ramparts were built.

Since 1862, the Château de Gisors has been recognised as a monument historique by the French Ministry of Culture.

See also
 List of castles in France
 Gérard de Sède
 French Romanesque architecture

References

Sources

Mesqui, Jean, Chateaux-forts et fortifications en France, Paris: Flammarion, 1997, p. 493. .

External links

 Article and photos on the château de Gisors 
 -  article and pictures 
 Ministry of Culture database entries for Gisors:
 
 

11th-century establishments in France
11th-century fortifications
Castles in Eure
Motte-and-bailey castles
Ruined castles in Normandy
Monuments historiques of Eure
William II of England